A dry dock (sometimes drydock or dry-dock) is a narrow basin or vessel that can be flooded to allow a load to be floated in, then drained to allow that load to come to rest on a dry platform. Dry docks are used for the construction, maintenance, and repair of ships, boats, and other watercraft.

History

Greco-Roman world
The Greek author Athenaeus of Naucratis (V 204c-d) reports something that may have been a dry dock in Ptolemaic Egypt in the reign of Ptolemy IV Philopator (221-204 BC) on the occasion of the launch of the enormous Tessarakonteres rowing ship. 

It has been calculated that a dock for a vessel of such a size might have had a volume of 750,000 gallons of water. In Roman times, a shipyard at Narni, which is still studied, may have served as a dry dock.

Medieval China
The use of dry docks in China goes at least as far back the 10th century A.D. In 1088, Song Dynasty scientist and statesman Shen Kuo (1031–1095) wrote in his Dream Pool Essays:

Renaissance Europe

The first early modern European and oldest surviving dry dock still in use was commissioned by Henry VII of England at HMNB Portsmouth in 1495 (see Tudor navy). This dry dock currently holds First World War monitor HMS M33.

Possibly the earliest description of a floating dock comes from a small Italian book printed in Venice in 1560, called Descrittione dell'artifitiosa machina. In the booklet, an unknown author asks for the privilege of using a new method for the salvaging of a grounded ship and then proceeds to describe and illustrate his approach. The included woodcut shows a ship flanked by two large floating trestles, forming a roof above the vessel. The ship is pulled in an upright position by a number of ropes attached to the superstructure.

Modern era
The Saint-Nazaire's Chantiers de l'Atlantique owns one of the biggest in the world: .  The Alfredo da Silva Dry Dock in Almada, Portugal, was closed in 2000. The largest roofed dry dock is at the German Meyer Werft Shipyard in Papenburg, Germany, it is 504 m long, 125 m wide and stands 75 m tall.

Harland and Wolff Heavy Industries in Belfast, Northern Ireland, is the site of a large dry dock . The massive cranes are named after the Biblical figures Samson and Goliath.

The largest floating-dock in North America is named The Vigorous. It is operated by Vigor Industries in Portland, OR, in the Swan Island industrial area along the Willamette River.

Types

Graving
A graving dock is the traditional form of dry dock.  It is a narrow basin, usually made of earthen berms and concrete, closed by gates or by a caisson. A vessel is floated in with the gates open, then the gates are closed and the water is pumped out, leaving the craft supported on blocks.

The keel blocks as well as the bilge block are placed on the floor of the dock in accordance with the "docking plan" of the ship. Routine use of dry docks is for the "graving" i.e. the cleaning, removal of barnacles and rust, and re-painting of ships' hulls.

Some fine-tuning of the ship's position can be done by divers while there is still some water left to manoeuvre it about.  It is extremely important that supporting blocks conform to the structural members so that the ship is not damaged when its weight is supported by the blocks. Some anti-submarine warfare warships have sonar domes protruding beneath the hull, requiring the hull to be supported several metres above  the bottom of the drydock.

Once the remainder of the water is pumped out, the ship can be freely inspected or serviced. When work on the ship is finished, the gates are opened to allow water in, and the ship is carefully refloated.

Modern graving docks are box-shaped, to accommodate newer, boxier ships, whereas old dry docks are often shaped like the ships that are planned to be docked there. This shaping was advantageous because such a dock was easier to build, it was easier to side-support the ships, and less water had to be pumped away.

Dry docks used for building Navy vessels may occasionally be built with a roof, to prevent spy satellites from taking pictures of the dry dock and any vessels that may be in it. During World War II, fortified dry docks were used by the Germans to protect their submarines from Allied air raids (see submarine pen).

An advantage of covered dry docks is that work can take place in any weather; this is frequently used by modern shipyards for construction especially of complex, high-value vessels like cruise ships where delays would incur a high cost.

Floating

A floating dry dock is a type of pontoon for dry docking ships, possessing floodable buoyancy chambers and a "U"-shaped cross-section. The walls are used to give the dry dock stability when the floor or deck is below the surface of the water. When valves are opened, the chambers fill with water, causing the dry dock to float lower in the water. The deck becomes submerged and this allows a ship to be moved into position inside. When the water is pumped out of the chambers, the dry dock rises and the ship is lifted out of the water on the rising deck, allowing work to proceed on the ship's hull.

A large floating dry dock involves multiple rectangular sections. These sections can be combined to handle ships of various lengths, and the sections themselves can come in different dimensions. Each section contains its own equipment for emptying the ballast and to provide the required services, and the addition of a bow section can facilitate the towing of the dry dock once assembled. For smaller boats, one-piece floating dry docks can be constructed or converted out of an existing obsolete barge, potentially coming with their own bow and steering mechanism.

Shipyards operate floating dry docks as one method for hauling or docking vessels. Floating drydocks are important in locations where porous ground prevents the use of conventional drydocks, such as at the Royal Naval Dockyard on the limestone archipelago of Bermuda. Another advantage of floating dry docks is that they can be moved to wherever they are needed and can also be sold second-hand. During World War II, the U.S. Navy used such auxiliary floating drydocks extensively to provide maintenance in remote locations. Two examples of these were the 1,000-foot AFDB-1 and the 850-foot AFDB-3. The latter, an Advance Base Sectional Dock which saw action in Guam, was mothballed near Norfolk, Virginia, and was eventually towed to Portland, Maine, to become part of Bath Iron Works' repair facilities.

A downside of floating dry docks is that unscheduled sinkings and off-design dives may take place, as with the Russian dock PD-50 in 2018.

The "Hughes Mining Barge", or HMB-1, is a covered, floating drydock that is also submersible to support the secret transfer of a mechanical lifting device underneath the Glomar Explorer ship, as well as the development of the Sea Shadow stealth ship.

The Great Balance Dock, built in New York City in 1854, was the largest floating drydock in the world when it was launched.

Alternative dry dock systems
Apart from graving docks and floating dry docks, ships can also be dry docked and launched by:
Marine railway — For repair of larger ships up to about 3000 tons ship weight
Shiplift — For repair as well as for new-building. From 800 to 25000 ton ship-weight
Slipway, patent slip — For repair of smaller boats and the new-building launch of larger vessels

Other uses
Some dry docks are used during the construction of bridges, dams, and other large objects. For example, the dry dock on the artificial island of Neeltje-Jans was used for the construction of the Oosterscheldekering, a large dam in the Netherlands that consists of 65 concrete pillars weighing 18,000 tonnes each. The pillars were constructed in a drydock and towed to their final place on the seabed.

A dry dock may also be used for the prefabrication of the elements of an immersed tube tunnel, before they are floated into position, as was done with Boston's Silver Line.

Gallery

See also

 — 1942 attack on a dry dock during World War II.

References

Sources

External links

Encyclopædia Britannica, dry-dock
Carnival Liberty Cruise Ship in Dry Dock in Freeport, Grand Bahamas
"Docks's Life". All about floating docks of shipbuilding firm "Almaz". St.-Petersburg. Russia.

 
Coastal construction